Per Almaas (8 March 1898 – 25 July 1991) was a Norwegian politician for the Labour Party.

He was born in Selbu.

He was elected to the Norwegian Parliament from Sør-Trøndelag in 1950, but was not re-elected in 1954.

Almaas was a member of Strinda municipality council between 1928 and 1959, except for a period between 1940 and 1945 during the German occupation of Norway. He served as mayor from 1937 to 1940 and 1945 to 1955. From 1945 to 1947 he was also a member of Sør-Trøndelag county council. He chaired the local party chapter from 1936 to 1937 and the county chapter from 1937 to 1946.

Outside politics he was a school teacher by education, eventually advancing to become school director in Nidaros school district from 1954 to 1962 and in Sør-Trøndelag from 1963 to 1968.

References

1898 births
1991 deaths
People from Selbu
Labour Party (Norway) politicians
Members of the Storting
Mayors of places in Sør-Trøndelag
20th-century Norwegian politicians